Rabbi (Rabi in local dialect) is a comune (municipality) in Trentino in the northern Italian region Trentino-Alto Adige/Südtirol, located about  northwest of Trento.

Rabbi borders the following municipalities: Ulten, Martell, Bresimo, Peio, Malè, Mezzana, Commezzadura and Pellizzano.

Demographic evolution

References

Cities and towns in Trentino-Alto Adige/Südtirol